Griffin Stadium may refer to:

Ben Hill Griffin Stadium, the football stadium of the University of Florida
James Griffin Stadium, the football stadium of the  Concordia University, Saint Paul

See also
Griffith Stadium